Nova Centre is a mixed-use commercial development under construction in downtown Halifax, Nova Scotia, Canada. It comprises a hotel tower, two office towers, the new Halifax Convention Centre, retail space, and Grafton Place, a public pedestrian arcade that was formerly part of Grafton Street. It is being developed at a cost of $500 million by Halifax developer Argyle Developments Ltd.

History
The Nova Centre development occupies two city blocks in downtown Halifax. One block was formerly home to the longtime headquarters of the Halifax Chronicle-Herald newspaper.

The project has received federal, provincial, and municipal public funding as it will house, in the podium levels and basement, the new Halifax Convention Centre operated by the Crown corporation Trade Centre Limited (TDL).

In 2014, Halifax Regional Council approved the sale of a section of Grafton Street, running through the Nova Centre site, to Argyle Developments at a cost of $1.9 million. This section will remain open to the public as a covered pedestrian arcade, and will be rented out for events by the developer.

In October 2015, the Bank of Montreal signed a 10-year lease agreement and naming rights deal. The bank will establish their Atlantic Canadian headquarters in the office tower, and one of the towers will be named BMO Tower. The bank's flagship downtown branch will also be relocated to the ground level of the building.

Elements

Office towers
The two office towers are actually connected, and the floorplates can be combined, but the towers have separate cores. They are called the BMO Tower and South Tower respectively. Each tower offers 14,000 square feet of space per floor, or a combined 28,000 square feet per floor.

Convention centre
The Halifax Convention Centre is a conference centre that replaced the nearby World Trade and Convention Centre as the main convention venue in the city. The new, larger convention facility houses  flexible event space that allows Halifax to accommodate conventions and events that the former convention centre could not handle. The convention centre opened on December 15, 2017.

Hotel
One of the towers will house a 300 to 350-room luxury hotel.

Grafton Place
The section of Grafton Street purchased by the developer will function as both a pedestrian passageway and as an 18,000 square foot events space.

References

External links

 

Buildings and structures in Halifax, Nova Scotia
Office buildings in Canada